South Gippsland or variation, may refer to:

Places
South Gippsland, a primary sub-provincial geographic region of the Australian state of Victoria, which includes the Shire of South Gippsland
South Gippsland Shire (since 1994), a prefectural-level local government area in the Australian state of Victoria
Shire of South Gippsland (former) (1894-1994), a former prefectural-level local government area in the Australian state of Victoria
Electoral district of Gippsland South of the Victorian Legislative Assembly for the state of Victoria in Australia

Transportation
 South Gippsland railway line, Victoria, Australia; a rail line
 South Gippsland Railway, Victoria, Australia; a tourist railway
 South Gippsland Freeway, Victoria, Australia; 
 South Gippsland Highway, Victoria, Australia;

Other uses
 22nd Battalion (South Gippsland Regiment), a unit of the Australian army

See also

 
 
 Shire of South Gippsland (disambiguation)
 South (disambiguation)
 Gippsland (disambiguation)